Tarphiota geniculata is a species in the family of beetles known as Staphylinidae. It is found in North America.

References

Further reading

 
 
 

Aleocharinae
Articles created by Qbugbot
Beetles described in 1852